Thunderchopper is a 1986 video game published by Actionsoft. The DOS version was by Sublogic.

Gameplay
Thunderchopper is a game in which the player pilots a Hughes 530 MG Defender.

Reception
M. Evan Brooks reviewed the game for Computer Gaming World, and stated that "Thunderchopper lacks the elan and panache that one would have expected." Zzap!64 gave a positive review, giving an overall rating of 83% and calling it "A polished, technically impressive flight simulator."

Reviews
The Games Machine - Feb, 1990
Computer Gaming World - Jun, 1992
Computer Play

References

External links
Review in Compute!
Review in Compute!
Review in Compute!'s Gazette
Review in Info
Article in RUN magazine
Review in Power Play (German)

1986 video games
Apple II games
Combat flight simulators
Commodore 64 games
DOS games
Helicopter video games
Video games developed in the United States